Mary E. Miller may refer to:

 Mary Miller (actress), 1929-2020
 Mary Miller (Colorado businesswoman), 1843–1921
 Mary Miller (art historian)
 Mary Miller (politician), U.S. Representative from Illinois